Ligue des Antilles (or Antillean League) is a football cup tournament contested by teams from Guadeloupe and Martinique.

Previous winners

Before 1997
1947 : CS Moulien        [Guadeloupe]
1954 :      Arsenal           [Guadeloupe]
1955 : CS Moulien        [Guadeloupe]
1956 : Golden Star       [Martinique]
1957 :      CS Capesterrien   [Guadeloupe]
1958 : Golden Star   [Martinique]
1959 : Golden Star     [Martinique]
1962 :      CS Capesterrien   [Guadeloupe]
1964 :      CS Capesterrien [Guadeloupe]
1979 : Racing Club de Basse-Terre [Guadeloupe]

Since 1997

External links
List of Champions - RSSSF.com

Football competitions in Martinique
Football competitions in Guadeloupe
International club association football competitions in the Caribbean
Antilles